German submarine U-843 was a Type IXC/40 U-boat of the German Kriegsmarine during World War II. The submarine was laid down on 21 April 1942 at the DeSchiMAG AG Weser yard in Bremen, launched on 15 December 1942, and commissioned on 24 March 1943 under the command of Kapitänleutnant Oskar Herwartz. After training with 4th U-boat Flotilla in the Baltic Sea, U-843 was transferred to 2nd U-boat Flotilla on 1 November 1943 for front-line service, and was transferred to 33rd U-boat Flotilla on 1 October 1944. She carried out three war patrols, sinking one ship, and was sunk by a British aircraft on 9 April 1945.

Design
German Type IXC/40 submarines were slightly larger than the original Type IXCs. U-843 had a displacement of  when at the surface and  while submerged. She had two shafts and two  propellers.

U-843 was fitted with six  torpedo tubes (four fitted at the bow and two at the stern), 22 torpedoes, one  SK C/32 naval gun, 180 rounds, and a  SK C/30 as well as a  C/30 anti-aircraft gun. The boat had a complement of forty-eight.

Service history

First patrol
U-843 first sailed from Kiel on 7 October 1943, arriving at Trondheim, Norway, on the 12th. She commenced her first war patrol on 15 October, and headed out into the northern Atlantic. However, she had no successes, and finally arrived at Lorient, France, on 15 December after a voyage lasting 62 days.

Second patrol
The U-boat left Lorient on 19 February 1944, bound for the Indian Ocean. En route, on 8 April, she torpedoed and sank the unescorted 8,261 GRT British merchant ship Nebraska, dispersed from Convoy OS-71, south-west of Ascension Island. Two crew members were lost, while the master, 55 crewmen, eight gunners, and two stowaways were rescued. Oskar Herwarts surfaced U-843 and offered assistance to the three lifeboats launched from the Nebraska. This included charts torn from a chart atlas and gave position and course to steer to Brazil. Two lifeboats made landfall close to Recife months later. A third lifeboat was rescued by a British warship after several weeks.

An American B-24 bomber of US Navy Squadron VB-107 attacked the U-boat on 10 April, damaging its stern torpedo tubes. The U-boat abandoned its planned operations off Cape Town and continued into the Indian Ocean. U-843 arrived at the Japanese-controlled port of Batavia, Dutch East Indies, on 11 June after 114 days at sea. The U-boat then sailed to Singapore on 13–15 June, remaining there until 1 November, before returning to Batavia.

Third patrol
They then sailed back across the Indian Ocean, around the Cape, and up through the Atlantic, arriving back in Bergen, Norway, on 3 April 1945.

Fate
Leaving Bergen on 6 April 1945, U-843 was sunk on 9 April, in the Kattegat, west of Gothenburg, in position , by rockets from a British Mosquito fighter-bomber of No. 235 Squadron RAF. Of the U-boat's crew of 56, only 12 survived.

In 1958 the wreck was raised and transported to Moss in Norway, where it was scavenged due to its valuable contents such as tungsten in the keel, natural rubber and one metric ton of opium. The wreckage was then broken up at Gothenburg.

Wolfpacks
U-843 took part in five wolfpacks, namely:
 Körner (30 October – 2 November 1943) 
 Tirpitz 1 (2 – 8 November 1943) 
 Eisenhart 2 (9 – 15 November 1943) 
 Schill 3 (18 – 22 November 1943) 
 Weddigen (22 November – 7 December 1943)

Summary of raiding history

References

Bibliography

External links

 . Newsreel from British Pathé showing the U-834(sic) refloated.

German Type IX submarines
U-boats commissioned in 1943
U-boats sunk in 1945
World War II submarines of Germany
World War II shipwrecks in the Kattegat
U-boats sunk by British aircraft
1942 ships
Ships built in Bremen (state)
Maritime incidents in April 1945